Queen Sugar is an American drama television series created and executive produced by Ava DuVernay, with Oprah Winfrey serving as an executive producer. DuVernay also directed the first two episodes. The series is based on the 2014 novel of the same name by American writer Natalie Baszile. Queen Sugar centers on the lives of three siblings in rural Louisiana (Rutina Wesley, Dawn-Lyen Gardner, and Kofi Siriboe) who must deal with the aftermath of their father's sudden death and decide the fate of his 800-acre sugarcane farm. The mainstream themes in the series often accompany episodes centered on racial profiling, the long reach of chattel slavery in American history and the inequities in the criminal justice system, and other issues related to African Americans.

The show holds a 93% approval rating on review aggregator Rotten Tomatoes and has won two NAACP Image Awards and 12 total nominations. Critics have praised the racially progressive show for storylines that tackle universal issues such as culture, class, and gender, while highlighting elements that address specific concerns of African-American society as expressed by the show's predominantly black cast. 

Queen Sugar airs on Oprah Winfrey Network (OWN) and premiered on September 6, 2016. In January 2021, ahead of the fifth season premiere, the series was renewed for a sixth season, which premiered on September 7, 2021. Ahead of the sixth season finale, it was announced that the series was renewed for a 13-episode seventh and final season, which premiered on September 6, 2022.

Plot 
The series follows the lives of three siblings in rural Louisiana: Nova Bordelon (played by Rutina Wesley), a formidable journalist and activist from New Orleans; Charley Bordelon (Dawn-Lyen Gardner), a working wife and mother in Los Angeles; and their brother, Ralph Angel Bordelon (Kofi Siriboe), a single parent struggling with unemployment and raising his son alone. Their father has recently died and unexpectedly bequeathed an 800-acre sugarcane farm in equal proportion to each of his three children in Louisiana. Recently divorced, Charley, whose husband is caught up in a scandalous affair, takes her teenage son Micah and moves to the heart of rural Louisiana to operate the farm.

Cast and characters

Main cast
 Rutina Wesley as Nova Bordelon, the eldest Bordelon child. She is a journalist, activist and healer in New Orleans.
 Dawn-Lyen Gardner as Charlotte "Charley" Bordelon West, the second Bordelon child. She was conceived when their father Ernest moved west and married a white woman. She is the biracial half sibling to Nova and Ralph Angel, sports manager, mother of Micah and ex-wife of Davis West (seasons 1–6; Archive Footage season 7).
 Kofi Siriboe as Ralph Angel Bordelon, the youngest Bordelon sibling. He is looking to better himself after recently being released from prison. Tied strongly to his family land. 
 Nicholas L. Ashe as Micah West, Charley's and Davis' teenage son.
 Omar Dorsey as Hollingsworth "Hollywood" Desonier, a much younger oil rig worker, husband to Violet, and friend of the Bordelon family.
 Dondre Whitfield as Remy Newell, an irrigation specialist who was a friend and confidante to Ernest. He soon tries to help Ernest's grown children and soon becomes Charley's love interest (seasons 1–3; guest seasons 4 and 7).
 Timon Kyle Durrett as Davis West, a charismatic star basketball player, ex-husband of Charley, and father of Micah. His involvement in a sex scandal resulted in the end of their marriage, though they eventually reconcile and remarry (seasons 1–2; recurring seasons 3–6).
Greg Vaughan as Calvin Gaston, a married police officer and Nova Bordelon's longtime secret lover (season 1; guest season 2; recurring season 4–5, and 7)
 Ethan Hutchison as Blue Bordelon, Ralph Angel's and Darla's nine-year-old son. (seasons 1–5; guest season 6; recurring season 7)
 Marycarmen Lopez as Reyna Velez, Blue's elementary school teacher and Ralph Angel’s love interest (season 1)
 Tina Lifford as Violet Bordelon, the younger sister of Ernest Bordelon. She acts as the matriarch of the family and lives with her husband, Hollywood.
 Bianca Lawson as Darla Bordelon (née Sutton), Ralph Angel's wife and Blue and Tru's mother, seeking to reconnect with them both as she is in recovery from a drug addiction. (seasons 2–7; recurring season 1)
 Henry G. Sanders as Prosper Denton, a lifelong friend to Ernest and fellow farmer (seasons 3–7; recurring seasons 1–2).
Walter Perez as Romero Rodriguez, a doctor and love interest to Charley (season 4; recurring season 3)
 Tammy Townsend as Billie, Prosper's estranged daughter (seasons 6–7)

Recurring
Glynn Turman as Ernest Bordelon, the late patriarch of the Bordelon family and older brother of Violet (season 1)
True O'Brien as Stella, Micah's girlfriend in Los Angeles (season 1)<ref>{{cite web|last=Bowe|first=Jillian|url=http://daytimeconfidential.com/2016/04/12/obrien-and-vaughn-in-own-series|title=True O'Brien Joins Former DAYS Co-Star on OWN's Queen Sugar|work=Daytime Confidential|date=April 12, 2016|access-date=July 24, 2016|archive-date=September 17, 2016|archive-url=https://web.archive.org/web/20160917030003/http://daytimeconfidential.com/2016/04/12/obrien-and-vaughn-in-own-series|url-status=live}}</ref>
Reagan Gomez-Preston as Chantal Williams, Nova's friend and love interest 
Issac White as Devonte "Too Sweet" Bonclair, a teen who after being falsely imprisoned becomes the main focus of Nova's current crusade on how the parish DA has been railroading African-Americans (season 1; guest, season 3)
Tanyell Waivers as Keke Raymond, a teenage friend of the family who becomes Micah's girlfriend
Deja Dee as Sierra, Nova's college roommate
Sharon Lawrence as Lorna Prescott, Charley's mother
Michael Michele as Darlene, Darla's mother
Roger Guenveur Smith as Quincy, Darla's father
Alimi Ballard as Dr. Robert Dubois, an activist who is briefly Nova's love interest in the second season
Lea Coco as Jacob Boudreaux, a member of the Landry family who takes a special interest in Charley
Danielle Lyn as Lizy, Nova's fellow journalist and friend (season 2-3)
David Jensen as Samuel Landry, the owner of the most popular mill, the Landry mills, in the parish, who Charley and Ralph-Angel go up against
Brian Michael Smith as Toine Wilkins, Ralph Angel's childhood friend. He is transgender and influences Ralph's acceptance of his son Blue's differences (guest seasons 2–4)
Nikko Austen Smith as Asha Green, the old soul. One of Micha's activist high school friends. A brilliant, passionate teenager wanting to make a difference (seasons 3-4)
Vivien Ngô as Trinh Phan, a young woman who returns to help her parents with their seafood plant who becomes Ralph Angel's love interest (season 3) 
Tony Aidan Vo as Khanh Phan, the younger brother to Trinh and son of Mrs. Phan (season 3) 
Elyse Dinh McCrillis as Mrs. Phan, a Vietnamese American refugee and the mother to Khanh and Trinh; also Ralph Angel's boss at the seafood plant (season 3) 
Erica Tazel as Deesha Brown-Sonnier, a public defender and Ralph Angel's love interest (season 4)
 Paula Jai Parker as Celine (season 6)
 Marquis Rodriguez as Isaiah (season 6)
 McKinley Freeman as Dominic (season 6)
 Erika Ashley as Liza (season 6)

Guest roles
David Alan Grier as Jimmy Dale, Violet's abusive ex-husband (season 4)
Cree Summer as Octavia Laurent (season 4)
Bryan Terrell Clark as Darla's love interest who is also in recovery (season 4)
Amirah Vann as Parker Campbell, corporate lobbyist and bi-racial daughter of Sam Landry (season 4).
LaTonya Holmes as Realtor in "Pleasure Is Black" (season 4 episode 1, 2019).

Episodes
Series overview

Season 1 (2016)

Season 2 (2017)

Season 3 (2018)

Season 4 (2019)

Special (2021)

Season 5 (2021)

Season 6 (2021)

Season 7 (2022)

Production

Development
On February 2, 2015, it was announced that Oprah Winfrey Network had ordered a straight-to-series TV drama based on Queen Sugar, the 2014 novel by Natalie Baszile. Ava DuVernay and Oprah Winfrey, who worked on the 2014 film Selma, co-created the series, with DuVernay was set to write and direct the initial episodes. 

The first season began filming in February 2016 and contained 13 episodes. DuVernay announced on January 27, 2016, that the series would feature an all-women directorial team. On February 15, 2016, Melissa Carter served as showrunner alongside Ava DuVernay. Neema Barnette joined the series as director and producer. Award-winning director Tina Mabry is a producer and will also direct two episodes, and Anthony Sparks, an award-winning TV writer and professor, began as a co-executive producer for the series in its first season and is the show’s longtime head writer, Executive Producer, and Showrunner. It was later announced that singer-songwriter Meshell Ndegeocello would provide the score for the series. Queen Sugar is said to be the first television series in which female directors direct every episode of the series.

Casting
On January 13, 2016, Rutina Wesley was announced to play the role of Nova Bordelon. Further casting was announced January 27, 2016. Dawn-Lyen Gardner, Kofi Siriboe, and Omar Dorsey, who co-starred in Selma, were all announced in leading roles. On February 1, 2016, it was announced that Emmy Award-winner Glynn Turman will guest-star as Ernest Bordelon, the patriarch of the family who dies in the first episode. On February 16, 2016, it was announced that Tina Lifford, Dondre Whitfield, Timon Kyle Durrett and Nicholas L. Ashe were cast as series regulars. On February 23, 2016, Bianca Lawson and Greg Vaughan joined the cast as regulars, while Henry G. Sanders joined in a recurring role. Oprah Winfrey Network said that Winfrey, who earlier was announced as a recurring character, would not have an onscreen role. On March 11, 2016, it was announced that Marycarmen Lopez also was cast as regular. On April 6, 2021, Tammy Townsend joined the cast as a new series regular while Paula Jai Parker, Marquis Rodriguez, and McKinley Freeman joined cast in recurring roles for the sixth season.

Release
On August 1, 2016, the series was renewed for a second season ahead of the series' television premiere, which aired in a two-night premiere on June 20 and 21, 2017. The second season premiered on OWN in a two episode special on June 20 and 21, 2017. 

The show was renewed for a third season on July 26, 2017. The third season premiered in a two-night special on May 29 and 30, 2018. 

On August 8, 2018, the series was renewed for a fourth season. Following the renewal, co-executive producer Anthony Sparks was revealed to be the new showrunner, replacing Kat Candler. The fourth season premiered on June 12, 2019.

On September 12, 2019, OWN renewed the series for a fifth season which premiered on February 16, 2021. On January 14, 2021, ahead of the fifth season premiere, OWN renewed the series for a sixth season, which premiered on September 7, 2021. In November 2021, shortly before the sixth season finale, the series was renewed for a seventh and final season. The seventh season premiered on September 6, 2022.

Reception
The review aggregator website Rotten Tomatoes reported a 93% approval rating for the first season, with an average rating of  7.4/10 based on 41 reviews. The website's critical consensus reads, "With an authenticity of culture and place and strong performances throughout, Queen Sugar rises above melodrama in this alluring, unhurried and powerful portrait of a fractious black American family." Metacritic, which uses a weighted average, assigned a score of 75 out of 100 based on 25 critics for the season, indicating what the website considers to be "generally favorable reviews". A 100% approval rating for the second season was reported by Rotten Tomatoes, with an average rating of 8.03/10 based on 7 reviews.

Accolades

Novel

UCLA graduate Natalie Baszile started writing Queen Sugar, the novel, in the early 1990s, but the text was only completed ten years later. She first presented the manuscript to publishers in 2009 but without any success. After revising the book for another two years, she resubmitted the text, with one agent agreeing to represent her.

Baszile took part in a women writer's retreat in Hedgebrook. A friend of hers who was also at the retreat, the novelist Sarah Manyika, suggested that she read part of Queen Sugar to fellow residents. Leigh Haber, O, The Oprah Magazine'''s book editor was attending and loved the novel and passed it to people at Oprah's Harpo Productions. A few months after that, Harpo called to say they wanted to option the book for a project.

The book was published by Penguin in 2014 as Baszile's debut novel and, a few months later, OWN negotiated the deal to turn the book into a television series.

References

External links 
 
 

2016 American television series debuts
2010s American black television series
2010s American drama television series
2010s American LGBT-related drama television series
2020s American black television series
2020s American drama television series
2020s American LGBT-related drama television series
2022 American television series endings
English-language television shows
Lesbian-related television shows
Oprah Winfrey Network original programming
Television shows based on American novels
Television series about families
Television series about siblings
Television series by Harpo Productions
Television series by Warner Horizon Television
Television shows filmed in Louisiana
Television shows set in Louisiana